Statistics of JSL Cup in the 1989 season.

Overview
It was contested by 28 teams, and Nissan Motors won the championship.

Results

1st round
Kawasaki Steel 3-2 Mazda Auto Hiroshima
All Nippon Airways 2-1 Kofu
NKK 4-0 Osaka Gas
Fujita Industries 1-1 Kyoto Shiko
Furukawa Electric 1-0 Fujitsu
Matsushita Electric 0-0 (PK 1–3) Cosmo Oil
Yomiuri 2-0 Nippon Steel
Toyota Motors 3-0 Toho Titanium
NTT Kanto 3-3 (PK 5–4) Tanabe Pharmaceuticals
Yamaha Motors 3-0 Sumitomo Metals
Hitachi 1-1 (PK 2–4) Mazda
Honda 6-0 Teijin

2nd round
Nissan Motors 3-2 Kawasaki Steel
All Nippon Airways 2-1 NKK
Fujita Industries 4-2 Furukawa Electric
Cosmo Oil 1-4 Yanmar Diesel
Mitsubishi Motors 0-2 Yomiuri
Toyota Motors 1-1 (PK 5–4) NTT Kanto
Yamaha Motors 1-0 Mazda
Honda 1-1 Toshiba

Quarterfinals
Nissan Motors 2-0 All Nippon Airways
Fujita Industries 1-0 Yanmar Diesel
Yomiuri 4-2 Toyota Motors
Yamaha Motors 2-1 Toshiba

Semifinals
Nissan Motors 2-1 Fujita Industries
Yomiuri 0-1 Yamaha Motors

Final
Nissan Motors 1-0 Yamaha Motors
Nissan Motors won the championship

References
 

JSL Cup
League Cup